The Archdeacon of Pontefract is a senior ecclesiastical officer within the Diocese of Leeds.

As Archdeacon he or she is responsible for the disciplinary supervision of the clergy  within the five area deaneries of Dewsbury, Wakefield, Pontefract, Barnsley and Birstall.

History
The Archdeaconry was founded (from the Archdeaconry of Craven in the Diocese of Ripon) with the erection of the Diocese of Wakefield on 20 November 1888. From then until its reorganisation in 1927, the archdeaconry of Halifax comprised the northwestern corner of that diocese. In 1927, the archdeaconry was renamed to that of Pontefract and its borders moved to cover the eastern half of the diocese (the Huddersfield archdeaconry became the new archdeaconry of Halifax).

For many years the post of Archdeacon of Pontefract was combined with that of Bishop suffragan of Pontefract. The current incumbent is Peter Townley. Since the creation of the Diocese of Leeds on 20 April 2014, the archdeaconry has formed the Wakefield episcopal area.

List of archdeacons
Archdeacons of Halifax
1888–1906 (d.): Ingham Brooke
1906–1917 (res.): William Foxley Norris
1917–29 November 1923 (d.): Henry Walsham How
1923–1927: Richard Phipps (became Archdeacon of Pontefract)
In the diocesan reorganisation of 1927, the archdeaconry was renamed to Pontefract. (For Archdeacons of Halifax after 1927, see Archdeacon of Halifax.)
Archdeacons of Pontefract
1927–1930 (ret.): Richard Phipps (previously Archdeacon of Halifax)
1931–1938 (res.): Campbell Hone, Bishop suffragan of Pontefract
1938–1949 (res.): Tom Longworth, Bishop suffragan of Pontefract
1946–1954 (res.): Arthur Morris, Bishop suffragan of Pontefract
1954–1961 (res.): George Clarkson, Bishop suffragan of Pontefract
1961–1968 (res.): Eric Treacy, Bishop suffragan of Pontefract
1968–1981 (ret.): Edward Henderson (afterwards archdeacon emeritus)
1981–1992 (ret.): Ken Unwin (afterwards archdeacon emeritus)
1992–1997 (res.): John Flack
1997–2003 (res.): Tony Robinson
2003–2007 (res.): Jonathan Greener
2007–present: Peter Townley

References

Lists of Anglicans
 
Anglican Diocese of Leeds
Diocese of Wakefield
Lists of English people